The Bell Ranch Formation is a Late Jurassic (Kimmeridgian) geologic formation in eastern and northeastern New Mexico and the western Oklahoma panhandle. Fossil theropod tracks have been reported from the formation.

Description 
At the type section near Tucumcari, the formation consists of alternating beds of light gray sandstone and brownish red siltstone. Small gypsum nodules are present in the upper beds. Further north, in the valley of the Dry Cimarron, the facies changes to dark mudstone with no cycles and more abundant gypsum.

Fossil content 
The formation contains sandy track beds which are "mud-cracked" with finer brownish silty interbeds and an overlying conglomeratic sandstone which fills the mudcracks of the upper bed. Three trackways of large dinosaurs are present.

Ichnofossils
 Grallator (Eubrontes)
 cf. Gypsichnites sp.

History of investigation
The correlation with the Wanakah is uncertain. In 1987, Conrad et al. correlated the "brown-silt member" assigned  by Baldwin and Muehlberger to the Morrison Formation in the valley of the Dry Cimarron to the Bell Ranch Formation.

In 1992, Anderson and Lucas advocated abandoning the Bell Ranch Formation in favor of the Summerville Formation. However, this has not be universally accepted.

See also 
 List of dinosaur-bearing rock formations
 List of stratigraphic units with theropod tracks

References

Bibliography

Further reading
 

Jurassic formations of New Mexico
Geologic formations of Oklahoma
Jurassic System of North America
Kimmeridgian Stage
Sandstone formations
Siltstone formations
Ichnofossiliferous formations
Paleontology in Oklahoma